St. Mary's Honor Center v. Hicks, 509 U.S. 502 (1993), was a US labor law case before the United States Supreme Court on the burden of proof and the relevance of intent for race discrimination.

Facts
Hicks, who was a black employee of St Mary's Honor Center, a halfway house operated by the Missouri department of corrections and human resources, claimed race discrimination when he was demoted and discharged under the Civil Rights Act of 1964 §2000e-2(a)(1). He brought an action, in the United States District Court for the Eastern District of Missouri.

Judgment

District Court
The District Court (Stephen N. Limbaugh Sr.), found that (1)(a) the employee had established a prima facie case of racial discrimination, and (b) the reasons that the employer gave for the demotion and discharge were not the real reasons for the demotion and discharge, but that (2) the employee had failed to carry his ultimate burden of proving that his race was the determining factor in the employer's allegedly discriminatory actions.

Court of Appeals, Eighth Circuit
The United States Court of Appeals for the Eighth Circuit reversed and remanded, holding that, once the employee had proved all of the employer's proffered reasons for the adverse employment actions to be pretextual, the employee was entitled to judgment as a matter of law.

Supreme Court
The Supreme Court held, five judges to four, that Hicks' case failed to discharge the burden of proof. For the majority, Scalia J held (joined by Rehnquist, O'Connor, Kennedy, and Thomas) even if a plaintiff discredits an employer’s explanation, the employer can still win if the trier of fact concludes there was no discriminatory intent. The District Court's rejection of the employer's asserted reasons for its actions did not mandate a finding for the employee, because
(1) under Rule 301 of the Federal Rules of Evidence, a presumption did not shift the burden of proof;
(2) the Supreme Court had repeatedly stated that a Title VII plaintiff at all times bore the ultimate burden of persuasion;
(3) the Supreme Court had no authority to impose liability upon an employer for alleged discriminatory employment practices, unless an appropriate factfinder determined, according to proper procedures, that the employer had unlawfully discriminated;
(4) a holding that a finding for the employee as a matter of law was not mandated did not give special favor to employers whose evidence rebutting charges of racial discrimination was disbelieved;
(5) that an employer's proffered reason was unpersuasive, or even obviously contrived, did not necessarily establish that an employee's proffered reason of race was correct; and
(6) courts should not (a) treat discrimination differently from other ultimate questions of fact, or (b) make ultimate factual determinations on the basis of legal rules which were devised to govern the basic allocation of burdens and order of presentation of proof.

Souter J dissented (joined by White, Blackmun, and Stevens), arguing an employer would be better off presenting an untruthful explanation of its actions than presenting none at all. He would have held that in Title VII employment discrimination cases, proof of a prima facie case not only raised an inference of discrimination, but also, in the absence of further evidence, created a mandatory presumption in favor of the plaintiff. He said the majority's approach was "inexplicable in forgiving employers who present false evidence in court". He said the following:

Significance

See also

US labor law
 List of United States Supreme Court cases, volume 509
 List of United States Supreme Court cases
 Lists of United States Supreme Court cases by volume
 List of United States Supreme Court cases by the Rehnquist Court

Notes

External links

United States Supreme Court cases
United States Supreme Court cases of the Rehnquist Court
United States employment discrimination case law
1993 in United States case law
United States labor case law
United States racial discrimination case law